VA245 may refer to:
 Ariane flight VA245, an Ariane 5 launch that occurred on 20 October 2018
 Virgin Australia flight 245, with IATA flight number VA245
 Virginia State Route 245 (VA-245), a primary state highway in the United States